The Gibson is a mixed drink made with gin and dry vermouth, and often garnished with a pickled onion. In its modern incarnation, it is considered a cousin of the ubiquitous martini, distinguished mostly by garnishing with an onion instead of an olive. But the earliest recipes for a Gibson – including the first known recipe published in 1908 – are differentiated more by how they treat the addition of bitters.

Other pre-Prohibition recipes all omit bitters and none of them garnish with an onion. Some garnish with citrus twists. Others use no garnish at all. There is no known recipe for the Gibson garnished with an onion before William Boothby's 1908 Gibson Recipe.

History
The exact origin of the Gibson is unclear, with numerous popular tales and theories about its genesis. According to one theory, it was invented by Charles Dana Gibson, who created the popular Gibson Girl illustrations. Supposedly, he challenged Charley Connolly, the bartender of the Players Club in New York City, to improve upon a martini. As the story goes, Connolly simply substituted an onion for the olive and named the drink after the patron.

Another version now considered more probable recounts a 1968 interview with a relative of a prominent San Francisco businessman named Walter D. K. Gibson, who claimed to have created the drink at the Bohemian Club in the 1890s. Charles Clegg, when asked about it by Herb Caen, also said it was from San Francisco, not New York. Other reporting supports this theory; Edward Townsend, former vice president of the Bohemian Club, is credited with the first mention of the Gibson in print, in a humorous essay he wrote for the New York World published in 1898.

Another theory is that the Gibson after whom the drink was named was a popular California onion farmer, as seen in the publication Hutchings' illustrated California magazine: Volume 1 (p. 194) by James Mason Hutchings in 1857:

Other stories of the drink's origins feature apocryphal businessmen, including an American diplomat who served in Europe during Prohibition. Although said to be a teetotaller, he often had to attend cocktail receptions, where he'd ask for a martini glass filled with cold water, garnished with a small onion so he could distinguish his drink from others. A similar story involves an investment banker named Gibson, who would take his clients out for the proverbial three-martini business lunches. He purportedly had the bartender serve him cold water so he could stay sober while his clients became intoxicated; the cocktail onion garnish served to distinguish his beverage from those of his clients.

See also

 List of cocktails

References

Cocktails with gin
Cocktails with vermouth